= Sarandi, Porto Alegre =

Neighbourhood in Porto Alegre, Brazil

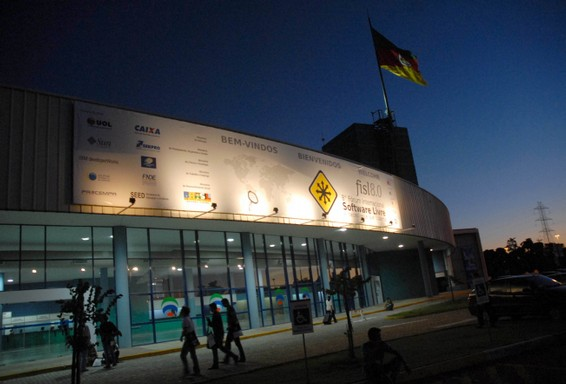
Fiergs.

Sarandi is a neighbourhood (bairro) in the city of Porto Alegre, the state capital of Rio Grande do Sul, in Brazil. It was created by Law 2022 from December 7, 1959.

Sarandi is home to the Industry Federation of the State of Rio Grande do Sul (Fiergs) and to Sesi Theater.
